Ullerentjernet is a small lake located  in  the municipality of Ringerike in Viken county, Norway. It is in  the Skjærdalsvassdraget   watershed formed by a number of smaller streams, rivers, ponds and marshes which drain  into Tyrifjord. Ullerentjernet is situated in Holleia, a hilly terrain with a forest switching between spruce and pine.

References

See also
List of lakes in Norway

Lakes of Viken (county)